Galanin receptor 1 (GAL1) is a G-protein coupled receptor encoded by the GALR1 gene.

Function 

The neuropeptide galanin elicits a range of biological effects by interaction with specific G-protein-coupled receptors.  Galanin receptors are seven-trans membrane proteins shown to activate a variety of intracellular second-messenger pathways.  GALR1 inhibits adenylyl cyclase via a G protein of the GI/GO family.  GALR1 is widely expressed in the brain and spinal cord, as well as in peripheral sites such as the small intestine and heart.

See also 
 Galanin receptor

References

Further reading

External links 
 

G protein-coupled receptors

sr:Galaninski receptor 3